Cycloscala is a genus of predatory sea snails, marine prosobranch gastropod mollusks in the family Epitoniidae, commonly known as wentletraps.

Species
According to the World Register of Marine Species, the following species with valid names are included within the genus Cycloscala :
 Cycloscala aldeynzeri E. F. Garcia, 2001
 Cycloscala armata Garcia, 2004
 Cycloscala crenulata (Pease, 1867)
 Cycloscala echinaticosta (d’Orbigny, 1842)
 Cycloscala gazae Kilburn, 1985
 Cycloscala hyalina (Sowerby G.B. II, 1844)
 Cycloscala laxata (G. B. Sowerby, 1844)
 Cycloscala laxatoides (Kuroda in Nakayama, 1995)
 Cycloscala montrouzieri Garcia, 2004
 Cycloscala parvilobata de Boury, MS
 Cycloscala revoluta (Hedley, 1899)
 Cycloscala sardellae Garcia, 2004
 Cycloscala semidisjuncta (Jeffreys, 1884)
 Cycloscala soluta (A. Adams, 1862)
 Cycloscala spinosa Nakayama, 2000
Species brought into synonymy 
 Cycloscala anguina (Jousseaume, 1912): synonym of Cycloscala crenulata (Pease, 1867)
 Cycloscala blandii (Mörch, 1875): synonym of Cycloscala echinaticosta (d’Orbigny, 1842)
 Cycloscala hyalina (Pilsbry, 1921): synonym of Cycloscala hyalina (Sowerby G.B. II, 1844)
 Cycloscala inconstans (de Boury, 1913): synonym of Cycloscala echinaticosta (d’Orbigny, 1842)
 Cycloscala jomardi (Audouin, 1827): synonym of Epitonium jomardi (Audouin, 1827)
 Cycloscala latedisjuncta (de Boury, 1911): synonym of Cycloscala revoluta (Hedley, 1899)
 Cycloscala okezoko Habe, 1961: synonym of Epitonium okezoko (Habe, 1961)
 Cycloscala volubilis (Mörch, 1875)  synonym of Cycloscala echinaticosta (d’Orbigny, 1842)

References

 Gofas, S.; Le Renard, J.; Bouchet, P. (2001). Mollusca, in: Costello, M.J. et al. (Ed.) (2001). European register of marine species: a check-list of the marine species in Europe and a bibliography of guides to their identification. Collection Patrimoines Naturels, 50: pp. 180–213

Epitoniidae